Peter Liechti (January 8, 1951 – 4 April 2014) was a Swiss movie director. He was born in St. Gallen, Switzerland.

He directed over 100 Swiss-German movies. He was nominated for many awards. Most of his movies were shown at the Berlin International Film Festival (BIFF). He was awarded an honorary awards at the BIFF in 2013.

Liechti died on 4 April 2014, aged 63.

Filmography 
 2013: Vaters Garten
 2009: Das Summen der Insekten – Bericht einer Mumie
 2006: Hardcore Chambermusic – Ein Club für 30 Tage
 2004: Namibia Crossings
 2003: Hans im Glück – Drei Versuche, das Rauchen loszuwerden
 1999: MSF Médécins sans Frontières – ein Versuch zum Elend in der Kultur
 1997: Marthas Garten
 1996: Signers Koffer – Unterwegs mit Roman Signer
 1991: A Hole in the Hat
 1990: Grimsel – Ein Augenschein
 1990: Roman Signer, Zündschnur
 1989: Kick That Habit
 1987: Drei Kunst-Editionen
 1987: Tauwetter
 1987: Théâtre de l’Espérance
 1986: Ausflug ins Gebirg
 1985: Senkrecht/Waagrecht
 1984: Sommerhügel

Awards 
 2014: Schweizer Filmpreis in der Kategorie Dokumentarfilm für Vaters Garten
 2013: Zürcher Filmpreis für Vaters Garten
 2010: Zürcher Kunstpreis
 2010: Kulturpreis der Stadt St. Gallen
 2009: Zürcher Filmpreis für The Sound of Insects
 2009: Europäischer Dokumentarfilmpreis Prix Arte für The Sound of Insects
 2005: Nomination für den Schweizer Filmpreis (Bester Dokumentarfilm) für Namibia Crossings
 2003: Zürcher Filmpreis für Hans im Glück
 1998: Berner Filmpreis für Martha’s Garten
 1996: Zürcher Filmpreis für Signers Koffer
 1996: Berner Filmpreis für Signers Koffer
 1995: Action Light Award Locarno für Signers Koffer
 1995: SSA Award (Bestes Drehbuch) für Signers Koffer
 1990: Berner Filmpreis für Grimsel
 1986: Kantonaler Kulturpreis St. Gallen

References

External links

1951 births
2014 deaths
European Film Awards winners (people)
Swiss film directors
People from St. Gallen (city)